Arakawa Dam is a concrete gravity dam located in Okinawa prefecture of Japan. The dam is used to collect drinking water for water supply, irrigation and flood control. The catchment area of the dam is 7.4 km2. The dam impounds about 16 ha of land when full and can store 1.65 million cubic meters of water. The construction of the dam started on 1971 and completed in 1976.

References

Dams in Okinawa Prefecture
1976 establishments in Japan